Arthroleptis xenodactyloides, also known as the dwarf squeaker or Chirinda screeching frog (and other names), is a species of frog in the family Arthroleptidae. It is found in eastern highlands of Zimbabwe and Malawi, central Mozambique, and eastern Zambia northwards to northeastern Tanzania and the Taita Hills of Kenya; it probably occurs in adjacent Democratic Republic of the Congo. Its natural habitats are lowland and montane forests, dense woodlands, grasslands, and swamps. It is locally threatened by habitat loss.

References

Arthroleptis
Frogs of Africa
Amphibians of Kenya
Amphibians of Malawi
Amphibians of Mozambique
Amphibians of Tanzania
Amphibians of Zambia
Amphibians of Zimbabwe
Taxa named by John Hewitt (herpetologist)
Amphibians described in 1933
Taxonomy articles created by Polbot